Luogang District is a former district of Guangzhou, the capital of Guangdong province, China.  It was merged into Huangpu District on 12February 2014.

Administrative divisions
Subdistricts
Luogang Subdistrict (萝岗街道), Xiagang Subdistrict (夏港街道), Dongqu Subdistrict (东区街道), Lianhe Subdistrict (联和街道), Yonghe Subdistrict (永和街道)

The only town is Jiulong (九龙镇)

Education
The middle and high school campus of the American International School of Guangzhou is in Science Park in the former Luogang District.

References

External links

Official website of Luogang District government
广州黄埔区与萝岗区合并 增城与从化撤市改区

Former districts of Guangzhou
States and territories disestablished in 2014
Huangpu District, Guangzhou